The Academy Award for Best Production Design recognizes achievement for art direction in film. The category's original name was Best Art Direction, but was changed to its current name in 2012 for the 85th Academy Awards. This change resulted from the Art Directors' branch of the Academy of Motion Picture Arts and Sciences (AMPAS) being renamed the Designers' branch. Since 1947, the award is shared with the set decorators. It is awarded to the best interior design in a film.

The films below are listed with their production year (for example, the 2000 Academy Award for Best Art Direction is given to a film from 1999). In the lists below, the winner of the award for each year is shown first, followed by the other nominees in alphabetical order.

Superlatives

Winners and nominees

1920s

1930s

1940s

1950s

1960s

1970s

1980s

1990s

2000s

2010s

2020s

See also
 BAFTA Award for Best Production Design
 Critics' Choice Movie Award for Best Production Design

Individuals with multiple wins

11 wins
 Cedric Gibbons

8 wins
 Edwin B. Willis

7 wins
 Richard Day

6 wins
 Thomas Little
 Walter M. Scott

5 wins
 Lyle R. Wheeler

4 wins
 John Box
 Samuel M. Comer
 F. Keogh Gleason
 George James Hopkins

3 wins
 Edward Carfagno
 Stuart Craig
 William S. Darling
 John DeCuir
 Vernon Dixon
 Hans Dreier
 Dante Ferretti
 Paul S. Fox
 Alexander Golitzen
 Paul Groesse
 John Meehan
 Ray Moyer
 Francesca Lo Schiavo
 Jack Martin Smith
 Richard Sylbert

2 wins
 Ken Adam
 E. Preston Ames
 Herman A. Blumenthal
 Henry Bumstead
 Donald Graham Burt
 Gene Callahan
 Rick Carter
 George Davis
 Leslie Dilley
 Michael D. Ford
 George Gaines
 Russell A. Gausman
 Nancy Haigh
 Harry Horner
 William A. Horning
 Hugh Hunt
 Wiard Ihnen
 Emile Kuri
 Terence Marsh
 Catherine Martin
 William Cameron Menzies
 Urie McCleary
 John Myhre
 Gil Parrondo
 Robert Priestley
 Stuart A. Reiss
 Norman Reynolds
 Dario Simoni
 Robert Stromberg
 Joseph C. Wright
 Peter Young

Notes

References

Best Production Design

Awards for best art direction